The Roman Catholic Diocese of Pathein (Lat: Diocesis Patheinensis) is a diocese of the Latin Church of the Roman Catholic Church in Burma. It is headquartered in the city of Pathein.

History
The diocese was erected as the diocese of Bassein in 1955, from the vicariate apostolic of Rangoon, which eventually became the Archdiocese of Yangon. In 1991, the name of the diocese was changed to the diocese of Pathein. The diocese is a suffragan of the Archdiocese of Yangon.

Ordinaries
George Maung Kyaw † (1 Jan 1955 Appointed - 1968 Died) 
Joseph Mahn Erie † (16 Feb 1968 Appointed - 3 Jun 1982 Resigned) 
Joseph Valerius Sequeira † (24 Jan 1986 Appointed - 22 Feb 1992 Retired) 
John Gabriel † (22 Feb 1992 Succeeded - 16 Aug 1994 Died) 
Charles Maung Bo, S.D.B. (13 Mar 1996 Appointed - 24 May 2003 Appointed, Archbishop of Yangon) 
John Hsane Hgyi (24 May 2003 Appointed - 22 Jul 2021 Died)

See also
Catholic Church in Burma

References

Pathein
Christian organizations established in 1955
Roman Catholic dioceses and prelatures established in the 20th century
1955 establishments in Burma